Wilkshire Hills is an unincorporated community and census-designated place (CDP) in Tuscarawas County, Ohio, United States. It was first listed as a CDP prior to the 2020 census.

The CDP is on the northern edge of Tuscarawas County, in the northeast corner of Lawrence Township. It is bordered to the northwest by the village of Bolivar, to the south by the village of Zoar, to the east by Sandy Township, and to the north by Pike Township and Bethlehem Township in Stark County. Wilkshire Golf Course is in the western part of the CDP.

Ohio State Route 212 passes through the community, leading northwest into Bolivar and southeast  to Sherrodsville. Interstate 77 passes just to the northwest of Wilkshire Hills, with access from Exit 93 (Bolivar). I-77 leads north  to Canton and south the same distance to Dover.

The Tuscarawas River forms the western border of Wilkshire Hills. The Tuscarawas, flowing south and west, is the main tributary of the Muskingum River, which flows south to the Ohio.

Demographics

References 

Census-designated places in Tuscarawas County, Ohio
Census-designated places in Ohio